Paradies is the final album by East-German rock group Silly before the death of lead singer Tamara Danz. It is also the only Silly album without band founder and guitarist Thomas Fritzsching.

Track listing
Köter (Hounds)
Asyl im Paradies (Asylum in Paradise)
Hölle (Hell)
Wo bist du (Where Are You)
Instandbesetzt (a pun on instandgesetzt, meaning refurbished, and besetzt, meaning occupied or squatted; thus "illegally occupied a building to fix it")
Downtown
Flut (Flood)
Vollmond (Full Moon)
Hut ab (Hats Off)
Hände hoch (Hands Up)
Flieg (Fly)
Schlaflied (Lullaby)
Asyl im Paradies (nightgroove version)

External links
Semi-official band website
Silly discography

Silly (band) albums